Ariadne is a genus of nymphalid butterflies, commonly called castors, found from Sub-Saharan Africa to South-East Asia. It was erected by Thomas Horsfield in 1829. The genus was named after Ariadne the daughter of Minos, king of Crete.

Species
Listed alphabetically:
Ariadne actisanes (Hewitson, 1875)
Ariadne albifascia (Joicey & Talbot, 1921)
Ariadne ariadne (Linnaeus, 1763) – angled castor (India, China, Ceylon, Indonesia, Vietnam)
Ariadne celebensis Holland, 1898
Ariadne enotrea (Cramer, [1779]) – African castor 
Ariadne isaeus (Wallace, 1869) – lesser angled castor
Ariadne merione (Cramer, [1777]) – common castor (Ceylon, India, Burma, Malaysia, Vietnam)
Ariadne merionoides (Holland, 1891)
Ariadne obscura (C. & R. Felder, [1867])
Ariadne pagenstecheri (Suffert, 1904) – Pagenstecher's castor (Cameroon, Rwanda, Burundi, eastern Zaire, Uganda, western Kenya, north-western Tanzania)
Ariadne personata (Joicey & Talbot, 1921)
Ariadne specularia (Fruhstorfer, 1899) (Cambodia, Vietnam)
Ariadne taeniata (C. & R. Felder, 1861) (Indonesia)
Ariadne timora (Wallace, 1869) (Timor)

References

Seitz, A. Die Gross-Schmetterlinge der Erde 13: Die Afrikanischen Tagfalter. Plate XIII 49

External links

Images representing Ariadne at Consortium for the Barcode of Life
Images representing Ariadne at Encyclopedia of Life

Biblidinae
Nymphalidae genera
Taxa named by Thomas Horsfield